I Guess I Was Hoping for Something More is an album by Montana band Tarkio, released under the Barcelona Records label.  Every track on the album was re-released by Kill Rock Stars as a part of the 2006 Tarkio collection Omnibus.

The title of the album is part of a lyric from the track "Kickaround".

Track listing
"Keeping Me Awake" – 5:42
"Caroline Avenue" - 5:31
"Neapolitan Bridesmaid" - 2:37
"Save Yourself" - 4:57
"Better Half" - 3:55
"Eva Luna" - 6:02
"Kickaround" - 5:18
"If I Had More Time" - 3:35
"Sister Nebraska" - 4:20
"Helena Won't Get Stoned" - 3:53
"Your Own Kind" - 5:13
"Candle" - 7:20

1998 albums